Jerzy Witold Pasiński (born 18 April 1947) is a Polish former Communist politician who was the mayor of Gdańsk from 1989 to 1990. He was notably the last mayor of Gdańsk from the Polish United Workers' Party, as well as the first mayor after the establishment of the Third Polish Republic.

In 1972, he graduated from the Faculty of Mechanical Engineering of Gdańsk University of Technology, and from 1972 to 1989, he worked at the Department of Machine Design and Operation, and from 1985 as a doctor in the field of tribology mechanics. From 1988 to 1989, he was employed at the Institute of Fluid Flow Machinery of the Polish Academy of Sciences. From 1984 to 1990, he was a councilman in Gdańsk, and was subsequently mayor from 1989 to 1990. He was mayor during the transition from the Polish People's Republic to the Third Polish Republic, of which his tenure saw protesting and general unrest against the former in Gdańsk, the city where Solidarity was established, as well as an attempt on behalf of PZPR by Pasiński to negotiate with the Solidarity activists. He was succeeded by Jacek Starościak, a member of Solidarity.

Since 2004, he has been working at Rudoport SA (Arcelormittal Poland SA Group) as the president of the board, general director and currently adviser to the board. Since 2001, he has been a member of the Rotary Club of Gdańsk-Sopot-Gdynia.

References

1947 births
Living people
Mayors of Gdańsk
Politicians from Bydgoszcz
20th-century Polish politicians
21st-century Polish politicians
Polish Workers' Party politicians
Gdańsk University of Technology alumni